The Mastodonsauroidea are an extinct superfamily of temnospondyl amphibians known from the Triassic.  Fossils belonging to this superfamily have been found in North America, Greenland, Europe, Asia, and Australia. The genus Ferganobatrachus from the Jurassic of Asia was initially included in this superfamily but later reinterpreted as a brachyopid and given a new name Gobiops.

References
The Paleobiology Database
&  2007 "Revision of the type material and nomenclature of Mastodonsaurus giganteus (Jaeger) (Temnospondyli) from the middle Triassic of Germany" Palaeontology 505:1245-1266

External links

Vertebrate superfamilies
Triassic temnospondyls
Jurassic temnospondyls
Early Triassic first appearances
Middle Jurassic extinctions
Capitosaurs